Arlis or ARLIS may refer to:

Art Libraries Society
Art Libraries Society of North America
Arctic Research Laboratory Ice Station
Alaska Resources Library and Information Services at UAA/APU Consortium Library
, known the interwar period as Arlis
Arlis Perry (1955–1974), American female murder victim

See also
Arliss (disambiguation)